Björn Rosenström, born August 8, 1970 in the boroughs Tynnered in Gothenburg who resides in Bollebygd, is a Swedish songwriter who has performed as troubadour. Nowadays, he is a part of Det jävla bandet during concerts and on the latest records. In Det jävla bandet, his brother Mark Lindvall also plays.

In addition to being a songwriter and performer, he is also a lawyer; he has a Candidate of Law-degree from the University of Gothenburg. Rosenström studied law 1991-1996, while he was actively involved in the university's pub business, where he quickly became known for his ironic and humorous songs that he performed on guitar in various celebrations. He says that he is the person who likes to study others, especially in pub environments among drunk people.

When Björn Rosenström graduated in 1996, he went into a recording studio with his brother Jonas and started recording the album Låtar som är sådär. The disc took just one and a half days to do. Rosenström published 1,000 copies of the discs that he sold at his old university's pub and bookstore.

Jonas Rosenström was the cornerstone of Rosenström Musik and a member in Det Jävla bandet until the spring of 2011, when he decided to go for a new career.

During 2011, Rosenström toured with Det jävla bandet in Sweden.

Members in the band 
Björn Rosenström – guitar & singer
Johan Strömberg – bass
Markus Netterlid Lindvall – drums
Fredrik Lidin – guitar, mandolin & choir
Pär Edwardson – guitar & choir
Håkan Svensson – guitar & choir
Nicklas Arlevall – sound engineer & tour manager
Robert Ölund och Jonas Hedlund – backline engineer
Jonas Rosenström – honorary member)

Discography 
Låtar som är sådär (1996)
Någorlunda hyggliga låtar (2000)
Glove Sex Guy (2001)
Var får jag allt ifrån? – En så kallad samling (2003)
Pop på Svenska (2004)
Syster Gunbritts hemlighet (2006)
Ett jubileum som är sådär – 10½ år med Björn Rosenström (2007)
Älska Hestrafors (singel) (2009)
Swingersklubb in the Radhuslänga (2010)
Olämpliga låtar (2012)
Vad Tänkte Jag Med? (singel) (2012)
Jul i Göteborg (singel) (2013)
Tuff pipa (2015)
Cuatro Klamydias (singel) (2016)
30 dårar (singel) (2021)
Torskarna (singel) (2022)

References

External links 
Official Website

1970 births
Living people
Swedish male musicians